Kenita Placide is a  human rights, HIV and LGBT activist from St. Lucia. She is the executive director of United and Strong and the Eastern Caribbean Coordinator of Caribbean Forum for Liberation and Acceptance of Genders and Sexualities (CariFLAGS). Between 2014 and 2016, she served at the Women's Secretariat for the International Lesbian, Gay, Bisexual, Trans and Intersex Association. She has been on the forefront of bringing LGBT issues into discussion throughout the Anglo-Caribbean and international community. In 2013, she was selected as Star Publishing's People’s Choice for Person of the Year in St. Lucia, the first time an LGBT person had been honored with the award in her country.

Biography
Kenita Placide grew up in the Castries Quarter of Faux A Chaux in St. Lucia, attending Canon Laurie Primary and Vide Boutielle Secondary School. She studied women’s psychology and women’s human rights at the Athabasca University and University of Toronto and was trained in HIV testing, counseling and facilitating. She later studied Computer Systems Analysis and Design and Computer Maintenance and Repair at the Sir Arthur Lewis Community College.

Advocacy
Her activism began at Vide Boutielle as a member of the school's Drug Free Club, where she served as a representative to the island's AIDS Committee and attended government health meetings from 1996 to 2000. In 2000, she co-founded United and Strong as an advocacy group to address the HIV/AIDS pandemic and they were able to register the organization in 2005. In 2006, Placide  represented United and Strong at a regional meeting, and the following year was elected to the Board of the organization and has served as its co-Executive Director since that time. With her joining the Board, United and Strong transitioned from a primarily health driven initiative to a human rights advocacy organization. While their primary focus is elimination of stigma and discrimination for lesbian, gay, bisexual, transgender and intersex (LGBTI) people, the organization seeks justice for all marginalized communities.

In 2008, Placide addressed the Constitution Reform Commission urging elimination of discrimination for LGBT citizens and in 2009 she participated in St. Lucia's Universal Periodic Review for the United Nations. The Review occurred in 2011 and United and Strong was the only NGO from St. Lucian to submit a shadow report, increasing the international exposure and networking opportunities for the organization and Placide.

In 2010 Placide was elected as a Secretary-General Alternate for the International Lesbian, Gay, Bisexual, Trans and Intersex Association (ILGA), served as the Alternate Women’s Secretariat from 2012, and in 2014 was elected as the ILGA Women's Secretariat. In 2016, her colleague Jessica St Rose took the position.

Since 2010, Placide has been an Outreach Officer at the AIDS Action Foundation and since 2012 the Eastern Caribbean Coordinator for Caribbean Forum for Liberation and Acceptance of Genders and Sexualities (CariFLAGS). Placide also serves on the board of the Caribbean Alliance for Equality (CAE).

In July, 2011, Placide organized the first regional LGBT security and human rights training for the Organization of Eastern Caribbean States (OECS) and a regional documentation training for activists in 2013. In February 2012, she coordinated the first seminar in the Caribbean for International Dialogue on Human Rights. That same year, Placide led a public dialogue with the Ministry of Education and the Prime Minister’s office on the theme “Eradicate hate, educate”. The annual dialogue included the topic "education and awareness are the building blocks of acceptance and love," for 2015. In 2013, Placide and United and Strong, in conjunction with Fundashon Orguyo Korsou (Curaçao Pride Foundation) (FOKO) from Curaçao, hosted a Caribbean Women and Sexual Diversity Conference which brought together LBT women from 14 Caribbean countries in a networking and leadership session.

Placide received an award in 2012 from ILGA for her activism in spite of threats and the destruction of United and Strong's offices in an arson attack.
In 2013, she was selected as Star Publishing's People’s Choice for Person of the Year in St. Lucia, the first time an LGBT person had been honored with the award in her country.

Placide has been at the forefront of bringing LGBT issues into discussion in St. Lucia and throughout the Anglo-Caribbean and international community. Through regional and international networks, she is developing strategies to overcome the reluctance to embrace diversity in the Caribbean.

References

External links
Kenita Placide, a St. Lucian LGBT activist, shares her personal story

Living people
HIV/AIDS activists
Saint Lucian human rights activists
LGBT rights activists from St. Lucia
Year of birth missing (living people)
Women civil rights activists